Santiago Mariano Rodríguez Molina (born 8 January 2000) is a Uruguayan professional footballer who plays as an attacking midfielder for New York City FC.

Club career
Rodríguez is a youth academy graduate of Nacional. He made his official debut for the club on 4 February 2019 in 2019 Supercopa Uruguaya win against Peñarol.

On 3 November 2020, Montevideo City Torque confirmed they had signed Rodríguez, with the midfielder remaining at Nacional for the rest of the year.

On 9 June 2021, New York City FC confirmed they had signed Rodríguez on loan, with the midfielder joining the Major League Soccer side through to December 2022. He made over 50 league appearances for the club over two seasons, helping the team advance to and eventually win the MLS Cup in 2021. In September 2022, he was named the club's player of the month.

Rodríguez returned to the club on a permanent contract in March 2023, ending months of uncertainty surrounding his future with the club. After returning to Torque, which had loaned Rodríguez to New York City FC, he was subject to interest from Brazilian club Bahia and stated that Major League Soccer needed to "become more important." However, Rodríguez would return to New York City FC as a Designated Player, signing a four-year deal with the club.

Honours
Nacional U20
 U-20 Copa Libertadores: 2018

Nacional
 Uruguayan Primera División: 2019, 2020
 Supercopa Uruguaya: 2019

New York City FC
 Campeones Cup: 2022
 MLS Cup: 2021

Uruguay U20
 South American Games silver medal: 2018

References

External links

Santiago Rodríguez at playmakerstats.com (English version of ogol.com.br)

2000 births
Living people
Association football midfielders
Uruguayan footballers
Uruguay youth international footballers
Uruguay under-20 international footballers
Club Nacional de Football players
New York City FC players
Uruguayan Primera División players
Major League Soccer players
South American Games silver medalists for Uruguay
South American Games medalists in football
Uruguayan expatriate footballers
Uruguayan expatriate sportspeople in the United States
Expatriate soccer players in the United States
Designated Players (MLS)